Musannaf hadīth collections are defined by their arrangement of content according to topic and constitute a major category within the class of all such works.  Etymologically, musannaf is the passive particle of the Arabic verb sannafa, meaning to arrange by chapter, and so has the literal meaning of something that is sectionally arranged.  Though the designation can thus apply to any text so ordered, and indeed has been used with respect to such distinct genres as fiqh (i.e. Islamic jurisprudence), in practice it is most typically applied to compilations of ahadīth.

Numerous hadīth collections are of the musannaf variety, including each of the 6 canonical Sunni ones.  A less typical format is the musnad compilation, where content is arranged according to the original transmitter of the report, typically a companion of Muhammad.

References 

 , pp. 5–14
 , pp. 76–77

Hadith
Islamic terminology